Legal proceeding is an activity that seeks to invoke the power of a tribunal in order to enforce a law. Although the term may be defined more broadly or more narrowly as circumstances require, it has been noted that "[t]he term legal proceedings includes proceedings brought by or at the instigation of a public authority, and an appeal against the decision of a court or tribunal". Legal proceedings are generally characterized by an orderly process in which participants or their representatives are able to present evidence in support of their claims, and to argue in favor of particular interpretations of the law, after which a judge, jury, or other trier of fact makes a determination of the factual and legal issues.

Activities needed to have a court deem legal process to have been provided, such as through service of process.
Conduct of a trial, whether a lawsuit or civil trial, or a criminal trial.
Issuance and enforcement of court orders, including those imposing foreclosure or receivership.
Hearings, particularly administrative hearings.
Arbitration.

Congressional hearings are not generally considered legal proceedings, as they are generally not directed towards the imposition of a penalty against a specific individual for a specific wrong. However, impeachment proceedings are generally conducted as legal proceedings, although experts dispute the question of whether they are primarily legal proceedings, or are merely political proceedings dressed in legal formalities and language. Richard Posner, for example, has asserted that it was "the intent of the framers of the Constitution that an impeachment proceeding be primarily a legal proceeding, akin to a criminal prosecution, rather than a political one".

See also
Administrative proceeding
Removal proceedings

References

Further reading

Legal procedure